Malin Gustafsson  (born 24 January 1980) is a Swedish women's footballer and ice hockey player. As a footballer, she plays as a forward. She was a member of the Sweden women's national football team. She was part of the team at the 1999 FIFA Women's World Cup. She also competed in the women's ice hockey tournament at the 1998 Winter Olympics.

References

External links
 

1980 births
Living people
Swedish women's footballers
Sweden women's international footballers
Place of birth missing (living people)
1999 FIFA Women's World Cup players
Women's association football forwards
Swedish women's ice hockey players
Olympic ice hockey players of Sweden
Ice hockey players at the 1998 Winter Olympics
People from Skellefteå Municipality
Sportspeople from Västerbotten County